Matoušek (feminine Matoušková) is a Czech surname. Notable people with the surname include:

 Bohuslav Matoušek (born 1949) Czech violinist
 Gabriela Matoušková, Czech footballer
 Iveta Matoušková, Czech handballer
 Jan Matoušek, Czech footballer
 Jan Matoušek (rower), Czech rower
 Jaroslav Matoušek, Czech athlete
 Jiří Matoušek (disambiguation), multiple people
 Josef Matoušek (historian), Czech historian
 Josef Matoušek (athlete), Czech athlete
 Karel Matoušek, Czech wrestler
 Kateřina Matoušková, Czech-Canadian figure skater
 Matylda Matoušková-Šínová, Czech gymnast
 Petr Matoušek, Czech cyclist
 Tomáš Matoušek, Slovak ice hockey player

See also
Matuszek

Czech-language surnames
Patronymic surnames
Surnames from given names